The Fairfield Challenger (currently labeled Northbay Healthcare Men's Pro Championships for sponsorship reasons) is a professional tennis tournament played on hard courts. It is currently part of the ATP Challenger Tour. It is held annually in Fairfield, California, a suburb of San Francisco, since 2015.

Past finals

Singles

Doubles

References

External links
 Official website

ATP Challenger Tour
Hard court tennis tournaments in the United States
Recurring sporting events established in 2015
2015 establishments in California
Tennis tournaments in California